is the 4th single by Japanese girl group SKE48. It reached the 2nd place on the weekly Oricon Singles Chart and, as of February 6, 2012 (issue date), has sold 175,027 copies.

This was last full version music video featured on SKE48 official channel (YouTube); starting from "Banzai Venus" only short versions are featured.

Members

"1!2!3!4! Yoroshiku" 
 Team S: Masana Ōya, Yukiko Kinoshita, Yuria Kizaki, Mizuki Kuwabara, Akari Suda, Kanako Hirmatsu, Yuka Nakanishi, Jurina Matsui, Rena Matsui, Kumi Yagami
 Team KII: Anna Ishida, Airi Furukawa, Akane Takayanagi, Manatsu Mukaida
 Kenkyuusei: Kanon Kimoto, Erika Yamada

"TWO ROSES" 
Kinect
 Team S: Jurina Matsui, Rena Matsui

"Seishun wa Hazukashii" 
Akagumi
 Team S: Rumi Kato, Yuria Kizaki, Yukiko Kinoshita, Akari Suda, Shiori Takada, Aki Deguchi, Rena Matsui, Kumi Yagami
 Team KII: Shiori Iguchi, Shiori Ogiso, Momona Kitō, Seira Sato, Airi Furukawa, Mukaida Manatsu
 Kenkyuusei: Mai Imade, Kasumi Ueno, Sawako Hata, Kaori Matsumura, Haruka Mano, Miki Yakata, Madoka Umemoto, Shiori Kaneko, Kanon Kimoto, Emiri Kobayashi, Yumana Takagi, Mai Takeuchi, Marin Nonoyama, Minami Hara, Yukari Yamashita

"Cosmos no Kioku" 
Shirogumi
 Team S: Masana Oya, Haruka Ono, Mizuki Kuwabara, Yuka Nakanishi, Rikako Hirata, Kanako Hiramatsu, Jurina Matsui
 Team KII: Ririna Akaeda, Anna Ishida, Mikoto Uchiyama, Tomoko Kato, Makiko Saito, Mieko Sato, Akane Takayanagi, Rina Matsumoto, Reika Yamada, Tomoka Wakabayashi
 Kenkyuusei: Riho Abiru, Kyoka Isohara, Risako Goto, Erika Yamada, Asana Inuzuka, Ami Kobayashi, Mei Sakai, Aya Shibata, Rika Tsuzuki, Yuka Nakamura, Honoka Mizuno

"Soba ni Isasete" 
All current SKE48 members (57 members)

References

2010 singles
Japanese-language songs
Songs with lyrics by Yasushi Akimoto
SKE48 songs
MNL48 songs
2010 songs
Japanese television drama theme songs